The list of 2017 NFL draft early entrants is a list of college football players that declared for the 2017 NFL draft that had remaining years of NCAA eligibility. The list includes the year of college they declared as eligible for the draft, the pick they were selected at and the team that drafted them. A total of 103 players declared as eligible, 81 were drafted and 22 were undrafted.

Complete list of players 
The following players were granted special eligibility to enter the 2017 draft:

Notes

2017 NFL draft early entrants
2017 National Football League season